Brenthia ocularis is a species of moth of the family Choreutidae. It was described by Cajetan Felder, Rudolf Felder and Alois Friedrich Rogenhofer in 1875. It is found on Java.

References

Brenthia
Moths described in 1875